Funmi Martins was a Nigerian actress and a model. She was the mother of Mide Martins and she was known for her roles in Eto Mi, Pelumi, Ija Omode and many others.

Early life 
Funmi Martins was born in 1963 in Ilesa, Osun State. She spent her life in  Lagos and Ibadan

Career 
Funmi Martins started her career as a model. She debuted her acting career under the tutelage of Adebayo Salami in a 1993 movie called Nemesis. Since then, she has featured in different movies until her death in 2002.

Death 
Funmi Martins died of Cardiac arrest on 6 May 2002 at the age of 38 years.

References 

1963 births
2002 deaths
Nigerian actresses
Yoruba actresses
Yoruba women
Nigerian female models
Actresses in Yoruba cinema